Charlie Muscat (13 January 1963 – 13 January 2011) was a Maltese footballer.

Club career
During his career, Muscat played for Żurrieq on the Maltese top level, where he played as a striker. In the 1983/1984 season he became top goalscorer in the Maltese Football League.

International career
Muscat made his debut for Malta on 23 May 1984 in a FIFA World Cup qualification match against Sweden. He earned a total of six caps, scoring two goals. He has represented his country in 3 FIFA World Cup qualification matches.

Honours

Żurrieq
 Maltese FA Trophy: 1
 1985

 Maltese Player of the Year: 1
 1983–84

 Maltese Football League Top Goalscorer: 1
 1983–84

References

External links
 Biography – Times of Malta
Charles Muscat Passes Away

1963 births
2011 deaths
Maltese footballers
Malta international footballers
Association football forwards
Żurrieq F.C. players
St. Patrick F.C. players